Kurt Welzl (born 6 November 1954) is an Austrian former professional footballer who played as a striker. He scored 10 goals in 22 appearances for the Austria national team.

References

External links
 
 

1954 births
Living people
Austrian footballers
Footballers from Vienna
Association football forwards
Austria international footballers
1982 FIFA World Cup players
FC Wacker Innsbruck players
AZ Alkmaar players
Valencia CF players
K.A.A. Gent players
Olympiacos F.C. players
Grazer AK players
Austrian Football Bundesliga players
Eredivisie players
Super League Greece players
Belgian Pro League players
La Liga players
Austrian expatriate footballers
Austrian expatriate sportspeople in Spain
Expatriate footballers in Spain
Austrian expatriate sportspeople in the Netherlands
Expatriate footballers in the Netherlands
Austrian expatriate sportspeople in Belgium
Expatriate footballers in Belgium
Austrian expatriate sportspeople in Greece
Expatriate footballers in Greece
FC Swarovski Tirol players